The legislative districts of Camarines Norte are the representations of the province of Camarines Norte in the various national legislatures of the Philippines. The province is currently represented in the lower house of the Congress of the Philippines through its first and second congressional districts.

History 
Camarines Norte was represented as part of Ambos Camarines, particularly the at-large district in the Malolos Congress from 1898 to 1899 and the first and second districts beginning in 1907, prior to being granted its own representation, after the division of Ambos Camarines in 1919 into Norte and Sur. From 1978 to 1984, it was part of the representation of Region V.

The passage of Republic Act No. 9725 in 2009 abolished the lone district and divided the province into two districts starting in the 2010 elections.

Current Districts

Historical districts

Lone District (defunct) 

Notes

At-Large (defunct)

1943–1944

1984–1986

See also 
Legislative districts of Ambos Camarines

References 

Camarines Norte
Politics of Camarines Norte